The following is a list of former international Scottish rugby union players killed in the Second World War.

 Tom Dorward, died on 5 March 1941
 Drummond Ford, died on 12 December 1942
 John Forrest, died on 14 September 1942
 George Gallie, died on 16 January 1944
 D.K.A. MacKenzie, died on 12 June 1940
 Alastair McNeil, died on 26 January 1944
 Patrick Munro, died on 3 May 1942, aged 58
 William Penman, died on 3 October 1943
 William Renwick, died on 15 June 1944
 James Ritchie, died on 6 July 1942
 George Roberts, died on 2 August 1943
 William Alexander Ross, died on 28 September 1942
 Archibald Symington, died on 8 May 1941

See also
 List of Scotland rugby union players killed in World War I
 Eric Liddell, who died 21 February 1945, aged 43 in a Japanese camp.

References 

 

World 
      
Scotland in World War II
Scottish rugby
Scottish rugby union